Lure of the Night Club is a 1927 American silent drama film directed by Tom Buckingham and starring Viola Dana, Robert Ellis and Jack Dougherty.

Cast
 Viola Dana as Mary Murdock
 Robert Ellis as John Stone
 Jack Dougherty as Tom Loring 
 Bert Woodruff as Pop Graves
 Lydia Yeamans Titus as Aunt Susan
 Robert Dudley as Hired man
 Barrett Whitelaw as Nightclub Patron
 Rose Blossom as Party Girl
 Cora Williams as Spinster

References

Bibliography
 Robert B. Connelly. The Silents: Silent Feature Films, 1910-36, Volume 40, Issue 2. December Press, 1998.

External links
 

1927 films
1927 drama films
1920s English-language films
American silent feature films
Silent American drama films
American black-and-white films
Films directed by Tom Buckingham
Film Booking Offices of America films
1920s American films